{{Automatic taxobox
|taxon=Tergipes
|authority=Cuvier, 1805<ref>Cuvier, G. L. C. F. D. (1805). Mémoire sur la Scyllee, lEolide et le Glaucus, avec des additions au mémoire sur la Tritonie. Annales de Museum National d'Histoire Naturelle, Paris 6:416-436, pl. 61.</ref>
| image = Tergipes-tergipes.jpg
| image_caption = The nudibranch Tergipes tergipes, Gulen Dive Centre, Norway.
}}Tergipes''' is  a genus of sea slugs, specifically aeolid nudibranchs, marine gastropod molluscs in the family Tergipedidae.Tergipes is the type genus of the family Tergipedidae.

 Species 
Species within the genus Tergipes include:
 Tergipes antarcticus Pelseneer, 1903
 Tergipes edwardsii Nordmann, 1844
 Tergipes tergipes (Forsskål in Niebuhr, 1775)

Species names currently considered to be synonyms:
 Tergipes adspersus Nordmann, 1845 synonym of Tenellia adspersa (Nordmann, 1845)
 Tergipes affinis d'Orbigny, 1837 synonym of Doto affinis (d'Orbigny, 1837)
 Tergipes capellinii Trinchese, 1879 synonym of Eubranchus capellinii (Trinchese, 1879)
 Tergipes despectus (Johnston, 1835) synonym of Tergipes tergipes (Forsskål in Niebuhr, 1775)
 Tergipes doriae (Trinchese, 1874) synonym of Capellinia doriae (Trinchese, 1874)
 Tergipes fustifer Lovén, 1846 synonym of Capellinia fustifera (Lovén, 1846)
 Tergipes lacinulatus de Blainville, 1824 synonym of Tergipes tergipes (Forsskål in Niebuhr, 1775)
 Tergipes lacinulatus (Gmelin, 1791) synonym of Doris lacinulata Gmelin, 1791
 Tergipes pulcher Johnston, 1834 synonym of Limacia clavigera (O. F. Müller, 1776)
 Tergipes rupium Møller, 1842 synonym of Eubranchus rupium (Møller, 1842)
 Tergipes valentini (Eliot, 1907) synonym of Cuthona valentini

Ecology 
Species of Tergipes feed on hydroids, as reflected by the serrated radula.
A recent study showed that Tergipes tergipes is an amphi-atlantic species.

References

Tergipedidae
Taxa named by Georges Cuvier